Leoville or Léoville may refer to:
Léoville, commune in the Charente-Maritime département of France
Leoville, Prince Edward Island, community in Tignish, Prince Edward Island, Canada
Leoville, Saskatchewan, community in Saskatchewan, Canada
Leoville, Kansas, an unincorporated community in Decatur County, Kansas, U.S.
"Leoville", nickname and website name of technology writer Leo Laporte

See also
Château Léoville (disambiguation)